Xiaoshizi is an interchange station between Line 1 and Line 6 of Chongqing Rail Transit in Chongqing Municipality, China, which opened in 2011. It is located in Yuzhong District.

Station structure

Line 1

Line 6

Gallery

References

Yuzhong District
Railway stations in China opened in 2011
Chongqing Rail Transit stations